The Sadhu Goureswar College (S G College) is a college in Kanikapada area about 17 km from Jajpur city of Odisha state.

It started as a tutorial college in 1973 with the help of local people, especially the teachers, generous donations, and academic interest of many social workers and intelligentsia. In 1975 it goes to Govt. of Odisha undertaken. The college is affiliated to CHSE, Odisha, Utkal University for +2 and +3 (Science, Commerce & Arts) stream respectively. The college gets B Grade accreditation from the National Assessment and Accreditation Council (NAAC). Again in 2017, the college was re-accredited with B+ in 2nd cycle of assessment..

References

External links
 http://www.sgckanikapada.org.in/default.asp

Universities and colleges in Odisha
Utkal University
Jajpur district
1975 establishments in Orissa
Educational institutions established in 1975